The Journal of Medicinal Chemistry is a biweekly peer-reviewed medical journal covering research in medicinal chemistry. It is published by the American Chemical Society. It was established in 1959 as the Journal of Medicinal and Pharmaceutical Chemistry and obtained its current name in 1963. Philip S. Portoghese served as editor-in-chief from 1972 to 2011. In 2012, Gunda Georg (University of Minnesota) and Shaomeng Wang (University of Michigan) succeeded Portoghese (University of Minnesota). In 2021, Craig W. Lindsley (Vanderbilt University) became editor-in-chief. According to the Journal Citation Reports, the journal has a 2021 impact factor of 8.039, ranking it 1st out of 61 journals in the category "Chemistry, Medicinal".

See also
ACS Medicinal Chemistry Letters

References

External links

American Chemical Society academic journals
Medicinal chemistry journals
Biweekly journals
Publications established in 1959
English-language journals